Adam Armstrong may refer to:

 Bill Armstrong (politician) (Adam Alexander Armstrong, 1909–1982), Australian politician
 Adam Armstrong (footballer) (born 1997), English footballer for Southampton F.C.
 Adam Armstrong (rugby union) (1878–1959), New Zealand rugby union player
 Adam Armstrong (settler) (1788–1853), arrived in Swan River Colony in 1829